Abel Ndenguet (born 24 June 1970) is a Congolese judoka. He competed in the men's middleweight event at the 1996 Summer Olympics.

References

External links
 

1970 births
Living people
Republic of the Congo male judoka
Olympic judoka of the Republic of the Congo
Judoka at the 1996 Summer Olympics
Place of birth missing (living people)
21st-century Democratic Republic of the Congo people